Pectocytheridae is a family of crustaceans belonging to the order Podocopida.

Genera

Genera:
 Ameghinocythere Whatley, Moguilevsky, Toy, Chadwick & Ramos, 1997
 Bidgeecythere McKenzie, Reyment & Reyment, 1993
 Ekpectocythere Choe, 1988

References

Podocopida